Anisomysis aikawai is a species of mysid (family: Mysidae, subgenus: Anomysis) and was first described in 1964 by Ii Naoyoshi. It is found in shallow marine waters.

References

Crustaceans described in 1964
Mysida